Antônio Gonçalves Teixeira e Sousa (March 28, 1812 – December 1, 1861) was a Brazilian poet, novelist and playwright, whose novel O Filho do Pescador (The Fisherman's Son) is considered to be the first Romantic novel in Brazil.

Life
Antônio Gonçalves Teixeira e Sousa was born in Cabo Frio, in 1812, to Portuguese Manuel Gonçalves and black Ana Teixeira de Jesus. His family was very poor, what made him quit his studies and become a carpenter. He exercised the profession in Itaboraí, moving then to Rio de Janeiro and later returning to Cabo Frio. In there, he discovered that his four older brothers died, and was alone in the world, with very sparse goods that his father gave to him.

He then decides to return studying. His teacher was the surgeon and poet Inácio Cardoso da Silva, whose poetry was compiled and then published by Sousa.

After concluding his studies, he moves definitely to Rio de Janeiro, dying there in 1861.

Works
 Cornélia (1840)
 Cânticos Líricos (1841–42)
 O Filho do Pescador (1843)
 Os Três Dias de um Noivado (1844)
 Tardes de um Pintor, ou As Intrigas de um Jesuíta (1847)
 A Independência do Brasil (1847–55)
 Gonzaga, ou A Conjuração de Tiradentes (1848–51)
 A Providência (1854)
 O Cavaleiro Teutônico, ou A Freira de Marienburg (1855)
 As Fatalidades de Dous Jovens (1856)
 Maria, ou A Menina Roubada (1859)

External links
 An article about Antônio Gonçalves Teixeira e Sousa's O Filho do Pescador 

1812 births
1861 deaths
Brazilian people of Portuguese descent
Brazilian male novelists
19th-century Brazilian poets
Brazilian male poets
Romantic poets
Brazilian male dramatists and playwrights
People from Cabo Frio
Portuguese-language writers
19th-century Brazilian novelists
19th-century Brazilian dramatists and playwrights
19th-century Brazilian male writers